Pollença is a town and municipality in the northern part of the island of Majorca, near Cap de Formentor and Alcúdia.

History

The name "Pollença" comes from the name of the Roman settlement of "Pollentia", the excavated remains of which lie several kilometers away, at the modern municipality of Alcúdia.

Main sights
Most houses were built in the 17th and 18th centuries and many streets are very narrow and compact, a legacy from the medieval era. The central square, called Plaça Major, has numerous outdoor cafés and is dominated by a large 13th-century church Esglèsia de Nostra Senyora dels Àngels (Our Lady of the Angels) which was built by the Knights Templar.

One of the town's most distinctive features is the 365-step stairway north of the square; this leads up to a chapel on top of the hill known as Calvary. On Good Friday this is the setting for the most dramatic parade of the year. First, on the road winding up the back of the hill, there is a reenactment of the Stations of the Cross. This is followed by a mock crucifixion on top of the hill after which the figure of Christ is ceremonially removed from the Cross. There is a sombre, torchlit parading of the body of Christ through the town led by hundreds of people in cloaks, masks and pointed hats and done in total silence save for the slow beating of a drum.

The town also has a 19th-century bridge of Romanesque design that crosses a stream to the north of town.

Most visited sights in Pollença town: Plaça Mayor, Plaça Vella, Can Llobera, Convent, Joan March Gardens, Calvari and Roman Bridge.

Beaches
Cala Figuera
Cala Murta
Cala Formentor
Cala Sant Vicenç (Cala Molins, Cala Barques, Cala Clara and Cala Carbó)
Cala Boquer
Puerto Pollença Beach
Llenaire Beach
Can Cuarassa Beach

References

External links

Pollença tourist guide
SOM POLLENÇA, tourist municipality
The Roman City of Pollentia
Pollensa Town

 
Populated places in Mallorca